The Nieuport 14 (or Nieuport XIV A.2 in contemporary sources) was a military reconnaissance sesquiplane produced in France during the First World War. The French Army deployed it in 1916 but the type was quickly withdrawn from front-line service.

Development
Nieuport started with the Nieuport 12 reconnaissance aircraft, but stretched its fuselage to balance the single nose-mounted Hispano-Suiza V-8 engine and its wingspan was increased by the addition of an additional bay. Protracted development that saw some refinement in the engine installation and the wing area increased from  square meters to  resulted in it entering service only in mid 1916.

Further development, with a larger engine and a further enlarged and airframe would result in the Nieuport 15.

Three additional unrelated airframes that some sources have connected to the Nieuport 14 were built, all featuring a nose radiator, single bay wings and a deep hunchback fuselage. One had large wing cut-outs to improve visibility and was fitted with a  Lorraine-Dietrich 8A engine, another with a  Hispano-Suiza engine, and a third with a  Hispano-Suiza engine and a crescent-shaped wing.

With its failure as a combat aircraft, a dedicated trainer variant was developed, the Nieuport 14 École with dual controls, nosewheels to guard against nose-over accidents, and an  Le Rhone 9C rotary engine in the place of the original V-8. It is possible that some of these airframes had been left over from the original production. When further refined, the trainer version was redesignated the Nieuport 82 E.2 and was nicknamed Grosse Julie ("Big Julie").

Operational history
Deliveries to reconnaissance squadrons commenced in late 1916, replacing obsolete Voisin III and V types. However, changing priorities resulted in production being curtailed as the Hispano-Suiza engines were desperately needed for SPAD VII fighters, and several units including Escadrille 102 and 103 that had planned on operating the Nieuport 14 became fighter units instead, operating the Nieuport 17.

With production halted prematurely, the remaining machines were relegated to training duties and as unit hacks once improvements had been made to their side-mounted Hazet radiators that had been the source of some problems. While the Nieuport 14 only saw service in France, the Nieuport 82 served more widely. Aside from flight schools in France, Brazil operated 9 Nieuport 82s from 1919 to 1924, and Japan operated a small number, with at least one acquiring the civil registration J-TOXC. The first Native American and African-American female aviator Bessie Coleman did some of her training in a Nieuport 82 in France.

Variants
 Nieuport 14 A.2 - service designation of prototype reconnaissance aircraft with  engine.
 Nieuport 14bis A.2 - designation of production reconnaissance aircraft with  engine.
 Nieuport 14 E.2 - initial service designation of trainer.
 Nieuport 82 E.2 - purpose-built trainer version with  rotary engine.

Operators

Aeronautique Militaire
Escadrille 62
Escadrille 69
Escadrille 112
Escadrille 202 (operated at least one example)
Escadrille 210 (operated one example)

Aviacao Militar

Imperial Japanese Army - Army Aviation Department

Specifications

See also

References

Citations

Bibliography

 014
1910s French military reconnaissance aircraft
Sesquiplanes
Single-engined tractor aircraft
Aircraft first flown in 1915
1910s French military trainer aircraft